Horia Bernea (14 September 1938, Bucharest – 4 December 2000, Paris) was a Romanian painter, who is considered part of the Neo-Orthodox Movement. Between 1990 and 2000, he was director of the Museum of the Romanian Peasant (Muzeul Țăranului Român, MȚR).

External links
Paintings
Wikiart Entry
 Editura Liternet: Horia Bernea, Irina Nicolau, Carmen Huluţă: Câteva gânduri despre muzeu, cantităţi, materialitate şi încrucişare / Dosar sentimental, 

1938 births
2000 deaths
20th-century Romanian painters